Florence Ibiyemi 'Yemi' Fawaz was a Nigerian fashion model, best known as the first Nigerian international supermodel with a career spanning over a decade. One of the pioneers of professional modelling in Nigeria, Fawaz was also a fashion designer, beauty promoter/consultant, actress, trade show organiser, chef, restaurateur, and deacon.

Early life and education 
Fawaz was born to a Lebanese father and a Nigerian mother, and raised by her grandmother. In 1983, she competed in Miss Universe Nigeria (later known as Most Beautiful Girl in Nigeria) and placed third. She left Nigeria for US in 1997. She came back to Nigeria in 2016 at 61 to continue modelling and to coordinate fashion shows.

Career 
Fawaz is considered the first Nigerian supermodel. At a point in her life, she became an ardent Christian and was ordained a Deaconess in her church. She then was addressed as Deaconess Yemi Fawaz.

Achievements 
Fawaz opened the first modeling school and professional modeling agency in Nigeria and in West Africa. She initiated and established a non-governmental organization (NGO) with the name Banner of Love which has the goals of providing medicare as well as eradicate poverty among the underprivileged.

Death 
Fawaz died at the New York Lenox Hill Hospital in United States of America after battling for colon cancer for years. She was 64 years old.

References 

2019 deaths
Nigerian female models